Rendezvous was the fourth album by the Canadian progressive rock band, CANO. Released in 1979, the album was produced by Jim Vallance, who later married CANO singer Rachel Paiement.

Rendezvous was the band's final studio album with most of its original lineup.

On the RPM charts, Rebound reached No. 97 on December 22, 1979.

Track listing
 "Rebound" (4:31)
 "Entente" (4:56)
 "Clown Alley" (3:09)
 "Sometimes the Blues" (4:36)
 "Other Highways" (4:42)
 "L'autobus de la pluie" (5:52)
 "Floridarity Forever" (3:45)
 "Mime Artist" (5:50)

Personnel
CANO:
Marcel Aymar - lead vocals, acoustic guitar
David C. Burt - electric guitar, acoustic guitar
Michel Dasti - drums, percussion
John Doerr - bass, trombone 
Michael Kendel - vocals, piano, keyboards, synthesizer, electric guitar
Wasyl Kohut - violins
Rachel Paiement - lead vocals, acoustic guitar

with:
Bryan Adams - background vocals on "Mime Artist"
John Anthony Helliwell - saxophone on "Rebound"
Brian Leonard - percussion on "Entente" and "Sometimes the Blues"
Monique Paiement - background vocals
Peter Schenkman - cello
Matt Zimbel - percussion on all tracks except "Entente" and "Sometimes the Blues"
Produced by Jim Vallance
Engineered and mixed by Howard Parrot

References

1979 albums
CANO albums